Nate is a South Korean web portal, developed by SK Communications. In 2003, Nate acquired social media site Cyworld and in 2004, it achieved first place in local page views with a total of 3.8 million, surpassing rival Daum for the first time. But its popularity have continuously decreased since early 2010s and as of 2020, its market share in South Korea is around 2%.

NateOn
NateOn is an instant messaging client provided by Nate, which in 2005 first overtook MSN Messenger in terms of South Korean user numbers. During the 3rd week of May 2005, NateOn's South Korean users totalled 7.54 million, compared to 6.5 million for MSN Messenger.

See also
 Cyworld
 SK Communications

References

External links
 www.nate.com 

Blog hosting services
Webmail
Online companies of South Korea
Internet properties established in 2001
Internet search engines
SK Group subsidiaries
Web portals